Jonathan Boakes (born 7 November 1973, in Kent, England) is an English game designer. He majors in writing adventure/psychological horror games such as the Dark Fall series and The Lost Crown. He is the CEO and founder of Darkling Room.
 
The games of Jonathan Boakes are usually designed based on real scenery, then the place is given a fictional name instead of using the real name in the game. One of his works, The Lost Crown, was based on the Polperro harbour, which was renamed as Saxton in the game.

Games

References

External links
 http://www.darklingroom.co.uk

1973 births
Living people
British video game designers